Claire Rhiannon Carver-Dias  (born May 19, 1977 in Burlington, Ontario) is a Canadian competitor in synchronized swimming and Olympic medallist.

Career
She grew up in Montreal, Quebec, but moved to Toronto in her late teens to pursue a career on the Canadian National Synchronized Swim Team.

From 1994 to 1996 Carver-Dias competed in the duet event and won several national titles with duet partner Estella Warren, who went on to become an international model and movie-star.

Carver-Dias won the gold medal at the 1999 Pan American Games in the Women's Duet alongside Fanny Létourneau, and a gold medal in the team event as well.

She participated on the Canadian team that received a bronze medal in synchronized team at the 2000 Summer Olympics in Sydney, Australia, and placed fifth in the duet event.

At the 2002 Commonwealth Games, Carver-Dias earned two gold medals, one in the solo event and one in the duet event.

She was the President of AthletesCAN from 2006 to 2008 and was elected to the board of Commonwealth Games Canada in 2014. She completed a master's degree at McGill University and currently works as an management consultant (www.clearday.ca). She also holds a PhD from the University of Wales, and has written a novel called "The Games," which earned her a Mississauga Literary Arts Award in 2013.

She is in the Mississauga Sports Hall of Fame, the Canada Games Hall of Honour, and the Synchro Quebec Hall of Fame; and hosted podcasts called "The Water Cooler Effect", and “Bright Lights, Big Sauga,” which are available on iTunes.

In 2018, she led Team Canada as the chef de mission of Canada's 2018 Commonwealth Games team, where the team tied their best ever medal haul.

References

External links
Olympic Info

1977 births
Living people
Canadian synchronized swimmers
Olympic bronze medalists for Canada
Olympic synchronized swimmers of Canada
Synchronized swimmers at the 2000 Summer Olympics
Olympic medalists in synchronized swimming
Medalists at the 2000 Summer Olympics
Commonwealth Games gold medallists for Canada
Pan American Games gold medalists for Canada
Commonwealth Games medallists in synchronised swimming
Pan American Games medalists in synchronized swimming
Synchronized swimmers at the 1999 Pan American Games
Medalists at the 1999 Pan American Games
Synchronised swimmers at the 2002 Commonwealth Games
Medallists at the 2002 Commonwealth Games